This is a list of regions of Tunisia by Human Development Index as of 2021.

References

Tunisia
Tunisia
Human Development Index